Gérard Miquel (born 17 June 1946) was a member of the Senate of France, representing the Lot department from
1992 to 2017. He was a member of the Socialist Party, until he changed to La République En Marche! in 2017.

References
Page on the Senate website

1946 births
Living people
French Senators of the Fifth Republic
Socialist Party (France) politicians
La République En Marche! politicians
Senators of Lot (department)